George Medd Butt (1797 – 11 November 1860) was a British Conservative politician.

Butt was first elected Conservative MP for Weymouth and Melcombe Regis at the 1852 general election, and held the seat until 1857 when he was defeated.

References

External links
 

Conservative Party (UK) MPs for English constituencies
UK MPs 1852–1857
1797 births
1860 deaths